James Chichester may refer to:

James Chichester, Earl of Belfast (born 1990)
Sir James Chichester, 12th Baronet (born 1951) of the Chichester baronets

See also
James Chichester-Clark (1923–2002), Northern Irish politician
James Lenox-Conyngham Chichester-Clark
Chichester (surname)